Rheine is a city in the district of Steinfurt in Westphalia, Germany. It is the largest city in the district and the location of Rheine Air Base.

Geography

Division of the city
There is no standard division of the city, different divisions are used for different purposes. The districts do not form administrative units. A detailed breakdown includes 21 districts.

 Altenrheine
 Baarentelgen 
 Bentlage
 Catenhorn
 Dorenkamp
 Dutum
 Elte
 Eschendorf 
 Gellendorf
 Hauenhorst
 Hörstkamp
 Innenstadt (city centre)
 Kanalhafen
 Mesum
 Rodde
 Schleupe
 Schotthock
 Stadtberg 
 Südesch
 Wadelheim
 Wietesch

The city of Rheine has eleven district advisory councils. For statistical purposes there is a division into 18 statistical districts. The city is divided into 22 electoral districts.

Eschendorf, Dorenkamp and Schotthock are the biggest districts by population, Catenhorn is the smallest.

Neighbouring municipalities

 Salzbergen
 Spelle
 Hörstel
 Emsdetten
 Neuenkirchen

History

Although the region around the city has been populated since prehistoric times, Rheine was first mentioned in a document signed by Louis the Pious in 838. On 15 August 1327 it received its town charter from Louis II, Bishop of Münster.

The settlement was near to the crossing of two old merchant roads and a ford over the river Ems. Frankish soldiers initially secured this strategic point by a barrack yard. Later a church and more buildings were added to this outpost.

At the end of the Thirty Years' War the city was burned down almost completely. Swedish and Hessian troops besieged imperial soldiers who had entrenched themselves in Rheine. On 20/21 September and 19 October 1647 glowing cannonballs set fire to the city and 365 houses were destroyed.

During the industrialization the textile industry prospered.  It remained an important economic factor until the second half of the 20th century. Today engineering industries and services form the largest part of economy in Rheine.

On 1 April 1927 about 10,000 inhabitants of the Office Rheine (Bentlage, Wadelheim, Dutum, etc.) were incorporated into the city, the population increased to 29,598, the city area was thus tripled.

In Nazi Germany, Jewish citizens were also deported from Rheine. The allied war opponents bombarded the city repeatedly, especially the railway line and the Dortmund-Ems Canal, which represented tactical goals. The large-scale attacks on 5 October met in 1944, and 21 March 1945, each with more than 200 dead and Injured the city area. The conquest of Rheine took place on 2 April 1945 after some fierce fighting by units of the 157th British Infantry Brigade (5th Battalion of the King's Own Scottish Borderers Regiment, 7th Battalion of the Cameronians (Scottish Rifles) Regiment).

Rheine was after the war in 1945 in the British occupation zone and 1946 was politically assigned to the newly founded Land of North Rhine-Westphalia. In 1949 it joined with the other Lander in the Western Zone to form the Federal Republic of Germany.

On 10 February 1946 Rheine was affected by the highest ever Emshochwasser. Large parts of the city were flooded.

On 15 August 2002 the city celebrated the 675th anniversary of the granting of municipal law.

Politics
The current mayor of Rheine is Peter Lüttmann of the Christian Democratic Union (CDU) since 2015. The most recent mayoral election was held on 13 September 2020. Lüttmann was the sole candidate and was re-elected with 90.6% of votes in favour and 9.4% against, on a turnout of 48.5%.

List of mayors
 1946–1948: Georg Pelster (1897–1963) (CDU)
 1948–1954: Albert Biermann (CDU)
 1954–1960: Balduin Echelmeyer (CDU)
 1960–1961: Franz Rudolf Kümpers (CDU)
 1961–1975: Albert Biermann (1903–1994) (CDU)
 1975–1994: Ludger Meier (CDU)
 1994–1999: Günter Thum (SPD)
 1999–2004: Wilhelm Niemann  (1949–2012) (CDU)
 2004–2015: Angelika Kordfelder (born 1955) (SPD)
 since 2015: Peter Lüttmann

City council
The Rheine city council governs the city alongside the Mayor. The most recent city council election was held on 13 September 2020, and the results were as follows:

! colspan=2| Party
! Votes
! %
! +/-
! Seats
! +/-
|-
| bgcolor=| 
| align=left| Christian Democratic Union (CDU)
| 13,885
| 47.2
|  1.3
| 23
|  2
|-
| bgcolor=| 
| align=left| Social Democratic Party (SPD)
| 6,444
| 21.9
|  8.1
| 10
|  3
|-
| bgcolor=| 
| align=left| Alliance 90/The Greens (Grüne)
| 4,196
| 14.3
|  4.5
| 7
|  3
|-
| bgcolor=| 
| align=left| Free Democratic Party (FDP)
| 1,663
| 5.7
|  0.6
| 3
|  1
|-
| 
| align=left| Independent Voters' Association Rheine (UWG)
| 1,380
| 4.7
|  0.3
| 2
| ±0
|-
| bgcolor=| 
| align=left| The Left (Die Linke)
| 993
| 3.4
|  0.8
| 2
| ±0
|-
| 
| align=left| Citizens for Rheine (BfR)
| 873
| 3.0
| New
| 1
| New
|-
! colspan=2| Valid votes
! 29,434
! 98.3
! 
! 
! 
|-
! colspan=2| Invalid votes
! 498
! 1.7
! 
! 
! 
|-
! colspan=2| Total
! 29,932
! 100.0
! 
! 48
!  4
|-
! colspan=2| Electorate/voter turnout
! 61,695
! 48.5
!  2.1
! 
! 
|-
| colspan=7| Source: City of Rheine
|}

Transport
Rheine is the western terminus of the Münster-Rheine railway.

 Rheine railway station
 Rheine-Mesum

Twin towns – sister cities

Rheine is twinned with:
 Borne, Netherlands (1983)
 Bernburg, Germany (1990)
 Leiria, Portugal (1996)
 Trakai, Lithuania (1996)

Notable people

Heinrich Meyring  (1628-1723), German sculptor
Moritz Dobschütz (1831–1913), German-American merchant
Carl Murdfield (1868-1944), painter
Josef Winckler (1881–1966), author
Carlo Mense (1886–1965), painter
Carl-Alfred Schumacher (1896-1967), military officer
Georg Pelster (1897-1963), politician (CDU)
Gustav Niemann (1899–1982), mechanical engineering scholar
Josef Pieper (1904–1997), philosopher
Rembert van Delden (1917-1999), politician (CDU)
Josef Paul Kleihues (1933-2004), architect
Harald Ibach (born 1941), physicist
Frank Ripploh (1949-2002), actor
Peter Funke (born 1950), historian
Josef H. Neumann (born 1953), art historian and photographer
Silvia Hildegard Haneklaus (born 1959), agricultural scientist
Bettina Hoy (born 1962), equestrian
Lisa Paus (born 1968), politician
Michael Prus (born 1968), footballplayer
Oliver Krüger (born 1973), professor of religious studies
Kerstin Stegemann (born 1977), footballer
Jonas Reckermann (born 1979), beach volleyball player
Julian Lüttmann (born 1982), footballplayer

In popular culture
In Harry Turtledove's alternate history novel trilogy The Hot War, Rheine is the site of a 1951 battle between NATO and Soviet armies during World War III.

References

External links
Official website
Association for Rheine's twin towns

 
Towns in North Rhine-Westphalia
Steinfurt (district)